Upper Whitewater Falls is a waterfall in North Carolina on the Whitewater River.  As with most of North Carolina's waterfalls, it is in the mountainous area of the state.  There is a cluster of falls in the area where the borders of Georgia and the Carolinas come together. Whitewater Falls is part of that group, very close to the South Carolina border.

According to the U.S. Forest Service, "With a 411-foot plunge, Upper Whitewater Falls in North Carolina is the highest waterfall east of the Rockies."

Natural history

The waterfall is protected by the Nantahala National Forest.  Although some claim that Whitewater Falls is simply the tallest East of the Mississippi, that title may belong to Crabtree Falls in Virginia, depending on how one defines "waterfall".  In fact, there is debate as to whether Whitewater falls is the tallest waterfall in North Carolina, as there are some in the state which may lay claim to being even taller, such as Glassmine Falls on the Blue Ridge Parkway.

There is a Lower Whitewater Falls in South Carolina about 2 miles downstream from Upper Whitewater Falls.

Visiting the Falls
Visitors to the falls must pay a $3/vehicle fee to view the falls.  There are several viewing platforms at varying heights that offer different views of the falls.

The area surrounding the falls is sufficiently treacherous that hiking off-trail in the area is strongly discouraged by park rangers.

The Foothills Trail  passes through the base of the falls.

Nearby Falls
Corbin Creek Falls

References

External links
Photos and stats
Whitewater Falls Brochure made by the Nantahala National Forest
Whitewater Falls on ncwaterfalls.com
Corbin Creek Falls on ncwaterfalls.com

Protected areas of Jackson County, North Carolina
Waterfalls of North Carolina
Protected areas of Transylvania County, North Carolina
Nantahala National Forest
Pisgah National Forest
Cascade waterfalls
Landforms of Jackson County, North Carolina
Waterfalls of Transylvania County, North Carolina
Articles containing video clips